The Life and Crimes of William Palmer is a British film made in 1998 about the Victorian poisoner 
William Palmer.
The film starred Keith Allen in the lead role, and was shot in the North Yorkshire village of Helperby.

External links
 

1998 films
British crime drama films
1990s British films